Guts: 8 Laws of Business from One of the Most Innovative Business Leaders of Our Time is a 2003 management book by Robert A. Lutz, former president of Chrysler.

A self-described "maverick", Lutz organizes the book around his "8 Immutable Laws of Business" which he poses as strawmen to demonstrate that even the best principles can be harmful if taken too far.  Lutz draws extensively from his personal experience to illustrate the business principles in the book.
 Law 1 - The Customer Isn't Always Right
 Law 2 - The Primary Purpose of Business Is Not to Make small money.
 Law 3 - When Everybody Else Is Doing It, Don't!
 Law 4 - Too Much Quality Can Ruin You
 Law 5 - Financial Controls Are Bad
 Law 6 - Disruptive People Are an Asset
 Law 7 - Teamwork Isn't Always Good
 Law 8 – When You Inherit a Really Big Rat’s Nest, Don’t Try to Lure Them Out with Food. Use a Flamethrower!
 Leadership Corollaries ????

Business books
2003 non-fiction books